Crazy Delicious is a British cooking competition that aired on Channel 4 from 21 January to 25 February 2020 and is hosted by Jayde Adams.

References

External links 
 
 
 

2020 British television series debuts
2020 British television series endings
English-language television shows
Channel 4 reality television shows
Television series by Optomen
Television series by All3Media
Television shows shot at BBC Elstree Centre